In the Middle of the Night is a 1984 Danish musical drama film directed by Erik Balling, which was the final film project Balling ever directed before his death. It stars Kim Larsen, Erik Clausen and Birgitte Raaberg.

Cast 
 Kim Larsen as Benny
 Erik Clausen as Arnold Jensen
 Birgitte Raaberg as Susan Himmelblå
 Holger Boland as Tusindfryd
 Buster Larsen as Charles
 Frits Helmuth as J.O. Kurtzen
 Poul Bundgaard as Kai Buhmann
 Judy Gringer as Rita
 Ove Sprogøe as Mr. Himmelblå
 Allan Olsen as Spacey
Additionally, Anders Hove portrays Nalle, while Henning Sprogøe portrays Knold.

Music

Soundtrack was composed by Kim Larsen.

Certifications

References

External links 

Entry in danskefilm

1984 drama films
1984 films
Danish musical drama films
Films directed by Erik Balling
Films with screenplays by Erik Balling